László Pákozdi (born 5 January 1951) is a Hungarian boxer. He competed in the men's heavyweight event at the 1976 Summer Olympics.

References

External links
 

1951 births
Living people
Hungarian male boxers
Olympic boxers of Hungary
Boxers at the 1976 Summer Olympics
People from Cegléd
Heavyweight boxers
Sportspeople from Pest County
20th-century Hungarian people